Polycarpou is a surname. Notable people with the surname include:

 Andy Polycarpou (born 1958), English footballer
 Eve Polycarpou, British actress and comedienne, member of Martha and Eve
 Peter Polycarpou (born 1957), English-Cypriot actor